The City of the Sun is a 2005 comedy film written and directed by Martin Šulík and starring Oldřich Navrátil and Ľuboš Kostelný. The film won the main prize at the 2005 Finále Plzeň Film Festival. At the 2006 ceremony for The Sun in a Net Awards, the film won in six categories. The film was Slovakia's submission for the Academy Award for Best Foreign Language Film for the 78th Academy Awards. The film won in two categories at the Czech Lion Awards, specifically for music and editing.

Cast 
Oldřich Navrátil as Karel
 as Tomáš
Ľuboš Kostelný as Vinco
Igor Bareš as Milan
Anna Cónová as Tereza
Petra Špalková as Marta
Anna Šišková as Vilma
Lucie Žáčková as Eva

See also 
List of Slovak submissions for the Academy Award for Best Foreign Language Film
List of Czech films of the 2000s

References

External links 

2005 comedy films
2005 films
Films directed by Martin Šulík
Sun in a Net Awards winners (films)
Czech comedy films
Slovak comedy films
2000s Czech films